Pichal Pairee is the second album by the Pakistani rock band Overload, released on 14 August 2009, after three years since their debut album. The first single of the album, "Pichal Pairee", was released on 23 September 2009. "Mela Kariyay" was released on October 9, 2009.

On 26 December, in an online poll by Dawn News the band's video for their single, "Pichal Pairee", was voted as the third best music video of 2010.

Track listing
All music arranged & composed by Sheraz Siddiq except "Pichal Pairee" composed by Hassan Mohyeddin.

Personnel
Overload
Sheraz Siddiq - keyboards/Synth Bass
Farhad Humayun - drums
Meesha Shafi - vocals, backing vocals
Mahmood Rahman - guitar
Nasir Sain - dhol

Additional musicians
 Pakhawaj on "Saat Mein": Ustad Allah Loke
 Clarinet on "A Thousand Miracles": Jaffer Hussain
 Hormonium: Shafqat Hussain
 Bass: Sameer Ahmad, Farhan Ali
 Pakhawaj: Ustab Allah Loke
 Electronic Music on Pichal Pairee: Hassan Mohyeddin

Production
Music Composition and Arrangement by Farhad Humayun & Sheraz Siddiq
Produced by Farhad Humayun
Recorded & Mixed at Riot Studios, Lahore, Punjab
Mixed by Farhad Humayun
Mastered by Shahi Hasan

References

External links
Official Website

2009 albums
Overload (Pakistani band) albums
Urdu-language albums